Cycling on NBC is the de facto name for broadcasts of multiple-stage bicycle races produced by NBC Sports, the sports division of the NBC television network. This includes broadcasts of the Tour de France, Vuelta a España, UCI World Tour Championships, Tour of California, USA Pro Cycling Challenge, and Liège–Bastogne–Liège.

Overview

Coors Classic coverage
In 1985, NBC broadcast the Coors International Bicycle Classic as part of its anthology program Sportsworld. Greg Lewis anchored NBC's coverage alongside Connie Carpenter and Alexi Grewal.

Tour de Trump coverage
From 1989 to 1990, NBC broadcast the Tour de Trump, which was a North American cycling stage race initially sponsored by businessman (and later U.S. President) Donald Trump.

For the very first edition in 1989, Dick Enberg anchored the coverage alongside Gary Gerould and analyst Clif Halsey. Greg Lewis meanwhile, interviewed cyclists after the final stage. NBC would cover at least two weeks worth of action for two hours each on Sunday afternoons while ESPN otherwise, provided the bulk of the coverage.

The following year, NBC announced that it would commit to airing at least six hours worth of the Tour de Trump race. This time, John Tesh anchored NBC's coverage alongside Phil Liggett.

Incidentally, the idea for the race was conceived by John Tesh, who had covered the 1987 Tour de France for CBS and on his return suggested holding a race in the United States to the basketball commentator and entrepreneur Billy Packer. Packer originally planned to call the race the Tour de Jersey. He approached representatives of casinos in Atlantic City for sponsorship, and Donald Trump offered to be the race's primary sponsor and Packer's business partner in the venture. It was Packer who suggested the Tour de Trump name.

Tour de France coverage

In 1999, NBCSN, then known as Outdoor Life Network (or OLN) acquired the U.S. broadcast rights to the Tour de France for US$3 million. Coverage of the Tour on OLN brought substantially greater viewership to the then fledgling channel, due in part to the then-growing popularity of American rider Lance Armstrong. In 2004, where Armstrong would aim for a record-breaking sixth straight Tour de France title, OLN would devote over 344 hours in July to coverage of the Tour, along with documentaries and other original programming surrounding the event – which was promoted through a US$20 million advertising campaign.

Overall, while its coverage of the Tour de France helped OLN expand its carriage to over 60 million homes, rumors surrounding Armstrong's possible retirement from racing led to concerns over OLN's emphasis on him (to the point that some critics referred to OLN as standing for "Only Lance Network"), with critics questioning whether the network could sustain itself without the viewership that Lance Armstrong's presence had brought to its coverage.

On June 15, 2004, the Discovery Channel signed a deal to become sponsor of the U.S. Postal Service Pro Cycling Team for the 2004–2007 seasons. As part of the sponsorship deal, Lance Armstrong, the team's undisputed leader, provided on-air appearances for the Discovery Networks TV channels. The deal did not affect the rights of secondary sponsor OLN in the US, to air major cycling events such as the Tour de France, although the two channels were competitors.

Following the 2005 Tour (where Armstrong captured his seventh victory in the race, and announced his retirement from cycling afterward), OLN debuted a new lineup of programming–led by the acquisition of off-network reruns of the reality competition series Survivor. OLN's executives believed that bringing Survivor into its lineup would fit well with the new direction it had planned for OLN, and could attract viewership from fans of the show who had watched it on CBS.

On June 9, 2016, it was announced that the "NBC Sports Tour de France Live" app would be relaunched as NBC Sports Gold ahead of the 2016 edition of the race. The rebranded service would also provide live, commercial free streaming coverage of several other cycling events for which NBC Sports was the rights holder including the  Vuelta a España and Paris–Roubaix. The service was initially priced at $29.99 for a year-long pass.

A second season of the cycling pass was announced on June 6, 2017, with the addition of new events including the UCI Road World Championships, Colorado Classic, and Volta a Catalunya. The pass also included 30 hours of 2017 Tour de France coverage exclusive to the platform.

On February 15, 2023, NBC Sports announced that it had renewed its media rights to broadcast the Tour de France through 2029.

CNBC's coverage

In 2015, CNBC aired portions of the 2015 UCI Road Cycling World Championships.

In 2020, CNBC aired Stage 14 and Stage 15 of the Tour de France.

In 2022, CNBC aired stage 8 of the Paris–Nice.

In 2022, CNBC will air portions of the Women's Tour de France.

Commentators

Adam Blythe – He was an "on-site" reporter for NBC Sports' coverage of the 2020 Tour de France, and fulfilled that role again for 2021.
Paul Burmeister – He has hosted NBC's studio coverage of the Tour de France.
Connie Carpenter
Jenna Corrado 
Chris Horner – In 2019, Horner joined the team of broadcaster NBC for their coverage of the Tour de France, acting as a commentator.
Todd Gogulski – In 2009, he joined the NBC Universal Sports cycling TV commentary team with Steve Schlanger, with whom he covers the Tour of the Basque Country, the Giro d'Italia, the Vuelta a España, the World Road Championships, Milan–San Remo, and others. For 2011, he joined the Versus Tour de France TV broadcasting team alongside Bob Roll, Phil Liggett, Paul Sherwen, and Liam McHugh.
Alexi Grewal
Todd Harris – Harris has acted as host for the network's coverage of the Tour de France. 
Craig Hummer – In 2010, Hummer was host of the daily news segments for Universal Sports' Vancouver Olympic Games coverage. He was an announcer on the Las Vegas Super Sprint in 2014, and became the announcer for La Course, a woman's race produced by Le Tour de France. 
Liam McHugh – In the summer of 2011, McHugh stepped into the role of host for NBC's live daily coverage of the Tour de France.
Greg Lewis
Phil Liggett  – Liggett has reported on over 15 Olympic Games and 44 Tours de France, generally alongside fellow veteran cycling commentators and former cyclists Paul Sherwen (UK) and Bob Roll (US). Because of his varied assignments, Liggett has worked for all of the American Big Three networks: ABC, CBS, and NBC.
 Carolyn Manno
Scott Moninger
Steve Porino
Bob Roll – He has been a member of the veteran cable television broadcasting team (along with Phil Liggett, MBE and Paul Sherwen) who served as road cycling expert-commentators for the NBC Sports Network cable network's coverage of the Tour de France, Vuelta a España, Giro d'Italia, Paris–Roubaix, Tour of California, and other international cycling road races.
Steve Schlanger
Paul Sherwen – Up until the conclusion of the 2016 Tour de France, Sherwen provided the commentary broadcast internationally for many television networks including Australia's SBS Network and the United States' NBC Sports with Phil Liggett.
John Tesh
Al Trautwig – He co-anchored coverage of the Tour de France from 2004 to 2007 on Versus (formerly OLN). Despite his years of experience as a broadcaster, he was sometimes criticized by cycling fans, for his occasionally uninformed commentary, and his tendency to compare the Tour to various mainstream sports he has covered.
Christian Vande Velde – He has been a cycling analyst for NBC Sports since 2014.
Jens Voigt – After his career, he worked as a TV presenter in Germany and in the USA. In the US he has been part of the NBC Sports coverage team which was initially led by Phil Liggett and Paul Sherwen, and was later led by Liggett and Bob Roll with added commentary from Voigt, Steve Porino, Christian Vande Velde, Paul Burmeister and Chris Horner.
Laura Winter – She is the NBC reporter and commentator for the Tour of California women's race.

Summer Olympics

References

External links

Tour de France | NBC Sports
NBC SPORTS’ COVERAGE OF THE 108TH TOUR DE FRANCE CONTINUES THIS WEEKEND ACROSS NBC, NBCSN & PEACOCK
NBC Sports Gold Cycling Pass

NBC original programming
NBCSN shows
NBC Sports
Sports telecast series
NBC
1989 American television series debuts
1990 American television series endings
2011 American television series debuts
1980s American television series
1990s American television series
2010s American television series
2020s American television series
Sportsworld (American TV series)